Orobazus was the ambassador of the Parthian king Mithridates II who contacted the Roman magistrate Lucius Cornelius Sulla.  This was the first meeting between a Parthian and a Roman official.  The results of this meeting are not clear, but it is generally known that during the meeting Sulla was sitting between the Parthian ambassador and Ariobarzanes I of Cappadocia the king of Cappadocia.  The center was considered the seat of honor, and for this the Parthian king put Orobazus to death for allowing a Roman magistrate to treat a Parthian envoy arrogantly.

Sources

External links
Plutarch's Life of Sulla

1st-century BC Iranian people
Ambassadors to ancient Rome
People from the Parthian Empire